Anya Seton (January 23, 1904 – November 8, 1990), born Ann Seton, was an American author of historical fiction, or as she preferred they be called, "biographical novels".

Career
Seton published her first novel, My Theodosia, in 1941.

Seton's historical novels were noted for how extensively she researched the historical facts, and some of them were best-sellers: Dragonwyck (1944) and Foxfire (1950) were both made into Hollywood films. Three of her books are classics in their genre and continue in their popularity to the present: Katherine, the story of Katherine Swynford, the mistress and eventual wife of John of Gaunt, and their children, who were the direct ancestors of the Tudors, Stuarts, and the modern British royal family; Green Darkness, the story of a modern couple plagued by their past life incarnations; and The Winthrop Woman about the notorious Elizabeth Fones, niece and daughter-in-law of John Winthrop, the first governor of the Massachusetts Bay Colony. Most of her novels have been recently republished, several with forewords by Philippa Gregory. In 2003, Katherine was chosen as the 95th best British novel of all time in a nationwide poll conducted by the BBC.

Her 1962 novel Devil Water concerns James, the luckless Earl of Derwentwater and his involvement with the Jacobite rising of 1715. She also narrates the story of his brother Charles, beheaded after the 1745 rebellion, the last man to die for the cause. The action of the novel moves back and forth between Northumberland, Tyneside, London, and the United States. Seton stated that the book developed out of her love for Northumberland. She certainly visited her Snowdon cousins at Felton. Billy Pigg, the celebrated Northumbrian piper played "Derwentwater's Farewell" especially for her. The novel shows her typical thorough research of events and places, though the accents are a little wayward. Seton said that her greatest debt of all was to Miss Amy Flagg of Westoe Village in South Shields, her father's birthplace.

Personal life

In 1904, Seton was born in Manhattan to English-born naturalist Ernest Thompson Seton and American travel writer Grace Gallatin Seton Thompson. She grew up in Cos Cob, Connecticut, in a wealthy family.

Seton married twice. Her first marriage at the age of 19 was to Rhodes scholar Hamilton Cottier, and they had two children, Pamela and Seton Cottier. Her second marriage was to investment counselor Hamilton (Chan) M. Chase in 1930. Together they had one daughter, Clemency, and they divorced in 1968.

She died in Old Greenwich, Connecticut, and was survived by two daughters, five grandchildren, and a great-grandchild. She is interred at Putnam Cemetery in Greenwich.

Works 
My Theodosia (1941)
Dragonwyck (1944)
The Turquoise (1946)
The Hearth and Eagle (1948)
Foxfire (1951)
Katherine (1954)
The Mistletoe and Sword (1955)
The Winthrop Woman (1958)
Washington Irving (1960) illustrated by Harvé Stein
Devil Water (1962)
Avalon (1965)
Green Darkness (1973)
Smouldering Fires (1975)

References

Further reading

External links

 Anya Seton's papers, housed at the Historical Society of the Town of Greenwich

1904 births
1990 deaths
20th-century American novelists
American historical novelists
American women novelists
Writers from New York City
20th-century American women writers
Writers of historical fiction set in the Middle Ages
Writers of historical fiction set in the early modern period
Women historical novelists
People from Cos Cob, Connecticut
Novelists from New York (state)
Ernest Thompson Seton